Kalash or Kalasha may refer to:

Peoples and languages 
Kalash people, or Kalasha, an ethnic group of Chitral, Pakistan
Kalasha-mun, a language of Chitral, Pakistan
Kalasha-ala, a language of Nuristan, Afghanistan

People with the name
Kalash (rapper) (Kévin Valleray, born 1988), a French rapper
Kalash Criminel (Amira Kiziamina, born 1995), a French rapper from the Democratic Republic of Congo
Kalash l'Afro (born 1979), a French rapper of Tunisian origin

Places
Kalasha Valleys, in Chitral District, Pakistan
Kalash, Iran, a village in East Azerbaijan Province, Iran
Kalash-e Bozorg, a village in Ardabil Province, Iran

Other uses
 Kalasha, or kalash, a pot used in Hindu rituals
 Mandir kalash, a spire in Hindu temples
 Kalash (footwear)
Kalash (TV series), an Indian soap opera 2001–2003
Kalash - Ek Vishwaas, an Indian soap opera 2015–2017
 Kalashnikov rifle, colloquially known as Kalash

See also
 Kailash (disambiguation)
 Kalach (disambiguation)
 Kalashnikov (disambiguation)

Language and nationality disambiguation pages